An androgen synthesis inhibitor is a type of drug which inhibits the enzymatic synthesis of androgens, such as testosterone and dihydrotestosterone (DHT). They include:

 CYP17A1 inhibitors (17α-hydroxylase/17,20-lyase inhibitors): inhibit the synthesis of androgens from pregnanes
 3β-Hydroxysteroid dehydrogenase inhibitors (3β-HSD inhibitors): inhibit the conversion of weaker androgens such as dehydroepiandrosterone (DHEA) and androstenediol into more potent androgens like and testosterone
 Cholesterol side-chain cleavage enzyme inhibitors (P450SCC/CYP11A1 inhibitors): inhibit the synthesis of pregnenolone from cholesterol, thereby inhibiting the synthesis of most steroid hormones (which are derived from pregnenolone) including androgens
 17β-Hydroxysteroid dehydrogenase inhibitors (17β-HSD inhibitors): inhibit the interconversion of androgens, including the synthesis of testosterone from the less-potent androstenedione
 5α-Reductase inhibitors (5α-RIs; SRD5A inhibitors): inhibit the conversion of testosterone into the more-potent DHT
 Steroid sulfatase inhibitors (STS inhibitors): inhibit the conversion of inactive androgen sulfates into active androgens like testosterone

Inhibitors of cholesterol synthesis can also reduce androgen production by inhibiting cholesterol production.

Androgen synthesis inhibitors have medical applications in the treatment of benign prostatic hypertrophy, prostate cancer, androgenetic alopecia, hirsutism, precocious puberty, and hyperandrogenism, among other androgen-dependent conditions.

Because androgens are the endogenous precursors of estrogens, androgen synthesis inhibitors also function as estrogen synthesis inhibitors and can reduce estrogen production and levels.

See also
 Antiandrogen § Androgen synthesis inhibitors
 Steroidogenesis inhibitor
 Progesterone synthesis inhibitor
 Estrogen synthesis inhibitor

References

Steroidogenesis inhibitors